Hans Robert Liljequist (born 27 January 1971 in Helsinki) is a retired male badminton player from Finland.

A member of the Helsingfors Badminton Club Liljequist competed in badminton at the 1992 Summer Olympics in men's singles. He lost in the second round to Hermawan Susanto, of Indonesia, 15-11, 15-3. In the 1990s, he won 6 titles at the Finnish National Badminton Championships.

References
 sports-reference

1971 births
Living people
Sportspeople from Helsinki
Finnish male badminton players
Badminton players at the 1992 Summer Olympics
Badminton players at the 1996 Summer Olympics
Olympic badminton players of Finland
20th-century Finnish people